The eighth cycle of Britain & Ireland's Next Top Model premiered on 9 July 2012 on Sky Living. Two judges from the previous cycle did not retain their positions. Elle Macpherson continued as the show's head judge along with designer Julien Macdonald, but model-actor Charley Speed and stylist Grace Woodward were replaced by designer Whitney Port, and male supermodel Tyson Beckford, who was previously a host on  Bravo's Make Me A Supermodel from 2008 to 2009.

Cycle 8 auditions began on Monday 14 November in Dublin Ireland, and wrapped up in Newcastle on Thursday 1 December. The filming of the show wrapped up in April 2012.

The prizes for this cycle included a modelling contract with Models 1, a fashion spread and cover feature in Company magazine, a contract with Revlon cosmetics, an international fashion campaign for Miss Selfridge, trip to Atlantis, The Palm in Dubai courtesy of Destinology, and an apartment at 51 Buckingham Gate.

The winner of the competition was 18 year-old Letitia Herod from Oxshott, Surrey.

Cast

Contestants
(Ages stated are at start of contest)

Judges
Elle Macpherson (host)
Tyson Beckford
Julien Macdonald
Whitney Port

Episodes

Result

 The contestant quit the competition
 The contestant was eliminated
 The contestant won the competition.

Bottom two

 The contestant was eliminated after her first time in the bottom two
 The contestant was eliminated after her second time in the bottom two
 The contestant was eliminated after her third time in the bottom two
 The contestant was eliminated in the final judging and placed as the runner-up

Average  call-out order
Final two is not included.

Notes

References

External links 
Official website

08
2012 British television seasons
2012 Irish television seasons
Television shows filmed in England
Television shows filmed in the United Arab Emirates
Television shows filmed in France
Television shows filmed in Toronto